The Roman Catholic Archdiocese of New Orleans is an ecclesiastical division of the Roman Catholic Church spanning Jefferson (except Grand Isle), Orleans, Plaquemines, St. Bernard, St. Charles, St. John the Baptist, St. Tammany, and Washington civil parishes of southeastern Louisiana. It is the second to the Archdiocese of Baltimore in age among the present dioceses in the United States, having been elevated to the rank of diocese on April 25, 1793, during Spanish colonial rule.

Its patron saints are the virgin Mary under the title of Our Lady of Prompt Succor and St. Louis, King of France, and Cathedral Basilica of Saint Louis is its mother church with St. Patrick's Church serving as a pro-cathedral.  The archdiocese has 137 church parishes administered by 387 priests (including those belonging to religious institutes), 187 permanent deacons, 84 brothers, and 432 sisters. There are 372,037 Catholics on the census of the archdiocese, 36% of the total population of the area. The current head of the archdiocese is Archbishop Gregory Michael Aymond.

The Roman Catholic Archdiocese of New Orleans reflects the cultural diversity of the city of New Orleans and the surrounding (civil) parishes. As a major port, the city has attracted immigrants from around the world. When French and Spanish Catholics ruled the city, some encouraged enslaved Africans to adopt Christianity, resulting in a large population of African American Catholics with deep heritage in the area. Later, Irish, Italian, Polish, Bavarian, and other immigrants have brought their heritage and customs to the archdiocese. The last quarter of the 20th century also brought many Vietnamese Catholics from South Vietnam to settle in the city. New waves of immigrants from Mexico, Honduras, Nicaragua and Cuba also have added to the Catholic population.

The Roman Catholic Archdiocese of New Orleans is also a metropolitan see of a province that spans the entire U.S. state of Louisiana. Its suffragan sees are the Diocese of Alexandria, Diocese of Baton Rouge, Diocese of Houma-Thibodaux, Diocese of Lafayette in Louisiana, Diocese of Lake Charles, and Diocese of Shreveport.

History

The Catholic Church has had a presence in New Orleans since before the founding of the city by the French in 1718. Missionaries served the French military outposts and worked among the native peoples. The area was then under the jurisdiction of the Bishop of Quebec. In 1721 Fr. Francis-Xavier de Charlevoix, S.J., made a tour of New France from the Lakes to the Mississippi, and visiting New Orleans, he describes "a little village of about one hundred cabins dotted here and there, a large wooden warehouse in which I said Mass, a chapel in course of construction and two storehouses".

In 1722 the Capuchins were assigned ecclesiastical responsibility for the Lower Mississippi Valley, while the Jesuits maintained a mission, based in New Orleans, to serve the indigenous peoples. The Jesuit vicar-general returned to France to recruit priests and also persuaded the Ursulines of Rouen to assume charge of a hospital and school. The royal patent authorizing the Ursulines to found a convent in Louisiana was issued September 18, 1726. Ten religious from various cities sailed from Hennebont on January 12, 1727, and reached New Orleans on August 6. As the convent was not ready, the governor gave up his residence to them. They opened a hospital for the care of the sick and a school for poor children.

France surrendered New Orleans and the rest of Louisiana Territory west of the Mississippi to the Spanish under the Treaty of Paris of 1763. From then until 1783, East Florida and West Florida were under British control, but both Florida colonies reverted to Spain as part of the Peace of Paris in 1783. Pope Pius VI erected the Diocese of Louisiana and the Two Floridas encompassing the pioneer parishes of New Orleans and Louisiana and both Florida colonies on April 25, 1793, taking its territory from the Diocese of San Cristobal de la Habana, based in Havana, Cuba. The diocese originally encompassed the entire territory of the Louisiana Purchase, from the Gulf of Mexico to British North America, as well as the Florida peninsula and the Gulf Coast.  This date of erection makes the present Roman Catholic Archdiocese of New Orleans the second oldest Catholic diocese in the present United States after the Roman Catholic Archdiocese of Baltimore, which the same pope had erected as the Diocese of Baltimore on November 6, 1789. The new diocese encompassed the area claimed by Spain as Louisiana, which was all the land draining into the Mississippi River from the west, as well as Spanish territory to the east of the river in modern-day Mississippi, Alabama, and Florida

In April 1803, the United States purchased Louisiana from France, which had in 1800 forced Spain to retrocede the territory in the Third Treaty of San Ildefonso. The United States took formal possession of New Orleans on December 20, 1803, and of Upper Louisiana on March 10, 1804. John Carroll, the Bishop of Baltimore, served as apostolic administrator of the diocese from 1805 to 1812.  The diocese became a suffragan of the see of Baltimore, which had been elevated to a metropolitan archdiocese in 1808, during this period. Archbishop Carroll's successor as apostolic administrator would eventually be the diocese's first resident bishop of the 19th century.

In 1823, Pope Pius VII appointed Joseph Rosati to the office of coadjutor bishop of the diocese. At the diocesan bishop's suggestion, the diocesan bishop was based in New Orleans while his coadjutor was based in St. Louis.

On 19 August 1825, Pope Leo XII erected the Apostolic Vicariate of Alabama and the Floridas, taking its territory from the Roman Catholic Archdiocese of Louisiana and the Two Floridas. Although the two Florida territories were no longer part of the diocese, he did not change its title.  But soon after, Bishop Rosati abruptly resigned the office of coadjutor bishop during a trip to Rome after which the Vatican decided to split the diocese again, making St. Louis a separate see. On 18 July 1826, the same pope
 Erected the Diocese of St. Louis, taking its territory from the Diocese of Louisiana and the Two Floridas and the Diocese of Durango,
 Erected the Apostolic Vicariate of Mississippi, taking its territory from the Diocese of Louisiana and the Two Floridas,
 Changed the title of the Diocese of Louisiana and the Two Floridas to Diocese of New Orleans, and
 Appointed Bishop Rosati as apostolic administrator of both the Diocese of New Orleans and the new Diocese of St. Louis.

On 19 July 1850, Pope Pius IX erected the Apostolic Vicariate of the Indian Territory East of the Rocky Mountains.  On the same day, he elevated the Diocese of New Orleans to a metropolitan archdiocese.

On 29 July 1953, Pope Pius IX erected the Diocese of Natchitoches, taking its territory from the archdiocese and making it a suffragan of the same metropolitan see.

On 11 January 1918, Pope Benedict XV erected the Diocese of Lafayette in Louisiana, taking its territory from the archdiocese making it a suffragan of the same metropolitan see.

On 22 July 1961, Pope John XXIII erected the Diocese of Baton Rouge, taking its territory from the archdiocese and making it a suffragan of the same metropolitan see.

On 2 March 1977, Pope Paul VI erected the Diocese of Houma-Thibodaux, taking its territory from the archdiocese and making it a suffragan of the same metropolitan see.

In its long history, the archdiocese and the city of New Orleans have survived several major disasters, including several citywide fires, a British invasion, the American Civil War, multiple yellow fever epidemics, anti-immigration and anti-Catholicism, the New Orleans Hurricane of 1915, Segregation, Hurricane Betsy, and an occasional financial crisis, not to mention Hurricane Katrina. Each time, the archdiocese rebuilt damaged churches and rendered assistance to the victims of every disaster. More recently, the church has faced an increased demand for churches in the suburbs and a decline in attendance to inner-city parishes. The church has also weathered changes within the Roman Catholic Church, such as the Second Vatican Council, and changing spiritual values throughout the rest of the United States.

The archdiocese sustained severe damage from Hurricane Katrina and Hurricane Rita. Numerous churches and schools were flooded and battered by hurricane-force winds. In the more heavily flooded neighborhoods, such as St. Bernard Parish, many parish structures were wiped out entirely.

Response to same-sex marriage
In early 2009, the state of Maine passed a law allowing same-sex civil marriage. In July 2009, the Roman Catholic Archdiocese of New Orleans contributed $2,000 of its money to a referendum campaign to overturn that law. According to Maine's "Commission on Governmental Ethics & Election Practices", the Roman Catholic Diocese of Portland Maine spent over $553,000 to overturn the law. The Roman Catholic Archdiocese of New Orleans' $2,000 was part of that $553,000.

2019 sex abuse scandal and bankruptcy
As of 2019, the Roman Catholic Archdiocese of New Orleans has listed 81 clergy who were "credibly accused" of committing acts of sex abuse while they were serving in the archdiocese. Some settled lawsuits filed against them while one, Francis LeBlanc, was convicted in 1996.

On January 24, 2020, staff of the New Orleans Saints admitted that the football team's Senior Vice President for Communications Greg Bensel "offered input on how to work with the media" to help the Roman Catholic Archdiocese of New Orleans handle the sex abuse scandal. Bensel advised the archdiocese to "Be direct, open and fully transparent, while making sure that all law enforcement agencies were alerted." Bensel was among a number of community and civic leaders consulted by the archdiocese before releasing the accused clergy names in November 2018.

On December 12, 2019, former New Orleans deacon Greg Brignac, aged 84, was arrested on a warrant accusing him of multiple acts of abuse, including raping an altar boy he met while teaching at Our Lady of the Rosary Parish in the late 1970s. Brignac posted a $1 million bail, but didn't return home and was immediately hospitalized after breaking his back in jail. In June 2020, Brignac, who remained hospitalized since December 2019, died while still awaiting trial. In December 2020, details describing a history of Brignac's alleged abuse were made public.

On May 8, 2020, it was revealed that the leader of the board of directors for one of the archdiocese's various ministries resigned his post recently after claiming in a lawsuit against the church that he was molested by one of its priests decades ago. The plaintiff who spoke on anonymity, claimed he resigned under duress. The archdiocese, which mediated a settlement in 2019, had previously agreed to pay for expenses which the plaintiff paid for six years of counseling. However, the plaintiff filed his lawsuit on April 7, 2020, after claiming that he discovered that the priest who allegedly molested him, James Collery, had more victims. Collery died in 1987. The lawsuit also claimed that the plaintiff first reported the abuse in 2013.

On May 19, 2020, it was revealed that all surviving accused clergy who served in the Roman Catholic Archdiocese of New Orleans had their payments suspended as part of the bankruptcy settlement, though some were trying to get their payments reinstated. Among those who tried to restore payment was retired Roman Catholic Archdiocese of New Orleans priest Paul Calamari, who tried to get his pension reinstated by admitting to U.S. Bankruptcy Judge Meredith Grabill on May 18, 2020, that he had a “failing” and a “sin” with a 17-year-old high school boy in 1973. On November 5, 2020, it was revealed that the Catholic Church paid one of Calamari's alleged victims $100,000 two years before deeming sex abuse allegations against him as credible. The father of alleged victim, known as Mark Vath, was also Calamari's cousin.

On August 19, 2020, Fr. Brian Highfill was added to the Roman Catholic Archdiocese of New Orleans' list of credibly accused clergy nearly two decades after his alleged actions of sex abuse were first reported against him. A trove of love letters which Highfill wrote to one of his victims, Scot Brander, in the 1980s backed allegations that he committed acts of sex abuse as well. Scot, who Highfill knew since the age of 10, later committed suicide, though his brother Michael Brander still pursued justice and preserved the love letters in a desk drawer. Despite indefinitely suspending Highfill from ministry in 2018, the archdiocese refused up to this point in time to deem sex abuse allegations against him as credible.  It was noted that Highfill was the 64th name added to the original list of credibly accused clergy which had been released in 2018.

On October 23, 2020, archdiocesan priest Rev. Pat Wattigny was arrested in Georgia on a warrant issued by the St. Tammany Parish Sheriff's office. Wattingny was charged with four counts of molestation of a juvenile, stemming from alleged sexual abuse of a teenage boy which occurred while he was leading a church in Slidell. Wattigny allegedly confessed to the Roman Catholic Archdiocese of New Orleans that he had started sexually abusing his victim in 2013.

On May 1, 2020, it was announced that the Roman Catholic Archdiocese of New Orleans had filed for chapter 11 Bankruptcy. The causes of the decision were said to be the mounting cost of litigation from sexual abuse cases and the unforeseen financial consequences of the COVID-19 pandemic. The archdiocese, which had a $45 million budget, owed $38 million in bonds to creditors and was also facing more pending sex abuse lawsuits. The pending sex abuse lawsuits, which were suspended due to the bankruptcy filing, would likely result in the already financially struggling Roman Catholic Archdiocese of New Orleans losing millions of dollars more. On August 20, 2020, victims of sex abuse by clergy who served in the archdiocese filed a motion in court to dismiss the bankruptcy.

Bishops

Bishops of Louisiana and the Two Floridas
 Luis Ignatius Peñalver y Cárdenas (1795–1801), appointed Archbishop of Guatemala
 Francisco Porró y Reinado (disputed, 1801–1803), then appointed Bishop of Tarazona in Spain
 Louis-Guillaume DuBourg (1815–1825), appointed Bishop of Montauban and later Archbishop of Besançon in France  - Joseph Rosati (coadjutor bishop 1823–1825, apostolic administrator 1826–1829); resigned as coadjutor bishop 1826, appointed first Bishop of St. Louis 1827

Bishops of New Orleans
 Leo-Raymond de Neckere (1830–1833)  - Auguste Jeanjean (appointed in 1834; resigned before assuming office)
 Antoine Blanc (1835–1850), elevated to Archbishop

Archbishops of New Orleans

 Antoine Blanc (1850–1860)
 Jean-Marie Odin (1861–1870)
 Napoléon-Joseph Perché (1870–1883)
 Francis Xavier Leray (1883–1887)
 Francis Janssens (1888–1897)
 Placide-Louis Chapelle (1897–1905)
 James Blenk, S.M. (1906–1917)
 John W. Shaw (1918–1934)
 Joseph F. Rummel (1935–1964)
 John P. Cody (1964–1965), appointed Archbishop of Chicago (elevated to Cardinal in 1967)
 Philip M. Hannan (1965–1989)
 Francis B. Schulte (1989–2002)
 Alfred C. Hughes (2002–2009)
 Gregory M. Aymond (2009–present)

Current auxiliary bishops
 Fernand J. Cheri, OFM (2015–present)

Former auxiliary bishops
 Gustave Augustin Rouxel (1899–1908)
 John Laval (1911–1937)
 Louis Abel Caillouet (1947–1976)
 Harold R. Perry, SVD (1966–1991)
 Stanley Joseph Ott (1976–1983), appointed Bishop of Baton Rouge
 Robert William Muench (1990–1996), appointed Bishop of Covington and later Bishop of Baton Rouge
 Dominic Carmon, SVD (1993–2006)
 Gregory Michael Aymond (1997–2000), appointed Coadjutor Bishop and later Bishop of Austin and Archbishop of New Orleans
 Roger Paul Morin (2003–2009), appointed Bishop of Biloxi
 Shelton Joseph Fabre (2007–2013), appointed Bishop of Houma-Thibodaux and later Archbishop of Louisville

Other priests of this diocese who became bishops
 Thomas Heslin, appointed Bishop of Natchez in 1889
 Cornelius Van de Ven, appointed Bishop of Natchitoches in 1904
 Jules Jeanmard, appointed Bishop of Lafayette in Louisiana in 1918 
 Robert Emmet Tracy, appointed Auxiliary Bishop of Lafayette in Louisiana in 1959 and later Bishop of Baton Rouge
 Joseph Gregory Vath, appointed Auxiliary Bishop of Mobile-Birmingham in 1966
 Gerard Louis Frey, appointed Bishop of Savannah in 1967 and later Bishop of Lafayette in Louisiana
 William Donald Borders, appointed Bishop of Orlando in 1968 and later Archbishop of Baltimore
 John Clement Favalora, appointed Bishop of Alexandria in 1986 and later Bishop of Saint Petersburg and Archbishop of Miami
 Thomas John Rodi, appointed Bishop of Biloxi in 2001 and later Archbishop of Mobile
 Joseph Nunzio Latino appointed Bishop of Jackson in 2003
 Dominic Mai Luong, appointed Auxiliary Bishop of Orange in 2003
 John-Nhan Tran, appointed Auxiliary bishop of Atlanta in 2022

Landmarks
The best known church in the New Orleans Archdiocese is the historic St. Louis Cathedral fronting the Spanish Plaza de Armas, now Jackson Square, in the French Quarter. This church was originally built in 1718, shortly after the founding of the city. The modest building was destroyed by fire several times before the current structure was built between 1789 and 1794 during the Spanish domination. During renovations to the cathedral between 1849 and 1851, St. Patrick's Church, the second-oldest parish in the city, served as the pro-cathedral of the archdiocese.

Parishes

The 108 parishes of the archdiocese are divided into 10 deaneries.

Schools

There are 5 Roman Catholic colleges and over 20 high schools within the Roman Catholic Archdiocese of New Orleans. Many of the churches throughout the archdiocese have primary schools as well.

Previously Catholic schools were racially segregated. In 1962 there were 153 Catholic schools; that year the archdiocese began admitting black students into schools that did not admit them; that year about 200 black children attended the archdiocese's Catholic schools previously not reserved for black children. The desegregation occurred two years after public schools had integrated. Bruce Nolan of The Times Picayune stated that because Catholic schools had a later desegregation, white liberal and African-American groups faced disappointment but that the integration had not produced as intense of a backlash.

Seminaries
Notre Dame Seminary
Saint Joseph Seminary College

Ecclesiastical province of New Orleans
See: List of the Catholic bishops of the United States#Province of New Orleans

See also
List of the Roman Catholic dioceses of the United States#Ecclesiastical province of New Orleans
:Category:Roman Catholic Archdiocese of New Orleans

Notes

References

External links

 Roman Catholic Archdiocese of New Orleans Official Site
 
 Nolan, Charles E. A History of the Archdiocese of New Orleans  May 2001
 Archdiocesan Statistics. 
 Catholic Charities of New Orleans.
 The Clarion Herald, the official newspaper of the Archdiocese of New Orleans.
 John and Kathleen DeMajo. Gallery of New Orleans Churches, including numerous Catholic Churches.

 
Religious organizations established in 1793
New Orleans
New Orleans
Christianity in New Orleans
1793 establishments in New Spain
Companies that filed for Chapter 11 bankruptcy in 2020